Helen Cowie FBPS, PGCE, is Emeritus Professor in the Health and Social Care division of the Faculty of Health and Medical Sciences at the University of Surrey.

Career
She is concerned with the promotion of emotional health and well-being in children and young people and is a world authority on bullying in schools, the home and the workplace. Professor Cowie is currently Director of the UK Observatory for the Promotion of Non-Violence at the University of Surrey.

Honorary positions 
 1998–present: Fellow of the British Psychological Society 
 2008-2009: Visiting Professor at Hiroshima University, Japan 
 2010 – 2017: Visiting Professor at Brunel University. UK 
 2010 – present: Docent Professor at Abo Akademi University, Vaasa, Finland

Publications

Selected books 
Jones, F., Cowie, H. & Tenenbaum, H. (2021) A School for Everyone:  Stories and Lesson Plans to Teach Inclusivity and Social Issues.  London: Hachette.

Cowie, H. (2020). Peer Support in Schools.  Malta: University of Malta. https://www.um.edu.mt/cres/our research/ourpublications

Cowie, H. (2019) From Birth to Sixteen. Second Edition. London: Routledge. (212 pages)

Cowie, H. & Myers, C-A. (2019) School Bullying and Mental Health: Risks, Intervention and Prevention. London: Routledge. (pp. 233) (Paperback edition)  
  
Cowie, H. & Myers, C-A. (2018). School Bullying and Mental Health: Risks, Intervention and Prevention. London: Routledge. (pp. 233) (Hardback edition)

Cowie, H. (2018). The Development of Children’s Imaginative Writing. (Reprinted from Croom Helm 1984 in Routledge Revivals) London: Routledge. (pp. 237)

Cowie, H. (2018). Counselling: Approaches and Issues in Education. (Reprinted from David Fulton 1994 in Routledge Revivals). London: Routledge. (pp. 129)

Cowie, H. (2018). Peer Counselling in Schools. (Reprinted from David Fulton 1996 in Routledge Revivals). London: Routledge. (pp. 153)

Cowie, H., Smith, P. K., Boulton, M. & Laver, R. (2018). Cooperation in the Multi-Ethnic Classroom (Reprinted from David Fulton 1994 in Routledge Revivals). London: Routledge. (pp. 214)

Cowie, H. & Myers, C-A. (2016). Bullying Among University Students: Cross-national Perspectives. London: Routledge. (pp. 213)

Cowie, H. & Jennifer, D. (2008) New Perspectives on Bullying. Maidenhead: Open University Press

Cowie, H. & Jennifer, D. (2007) Managing Violence in Schools. London: SAGE Publications

Smith, P.K., Cowie, H. & Blades, M. (Fifth Edition) (2010). Understanding Children’s Development. Oxford: Blackwell.

Cowie, H., Boardman, C., Dawkins, J. & Jennifer, D. (2004) Emotional Health and Well-Being. London: SAGE Publications

Cowie, H. & Wallace, P. (2000). Peer Support in Action. London: SAGE Publications

Recent journal articles 
Cowie, H. & Myers, C-A (2020). The impact of the COVID-19 pandemic on the mental health and well-being of children and young people, Children & Society. 35(1): 62-74 https://onlinelibrary.wiley.com/doi/full/10.1111/chso.12430

Myers, C-A. & Cowie, H. (2019). Cyberbullying across the educational lifespan, Journal of Environmental Research and Public Health, 16(7): 1-17.

Myers, C-A. & Cowie, H. (2018). Bullying at university: The social and legal contexts of cyberbullying among university students, Journal of Cross-Cultural Psychology, 48 (8): 1172-1182.

Cowie, H. & Myers, C-A. (2018) Bullying amongst students in further and higher education: the role of counsellors in addressing the issue, University and College Counselling, 6(3): 12-16.

Myers, C-A. & Cowie, H. (2016). How can we prevent and reduce bullying amongst university students? International Journal of Emotions in Education, 8(1): 109-119.

Colliety, P., Royal, C. & Cowie, H. (2016). The unique role of the school nurse in the holistic care of the bully. British Journal of School Nursing, 11(9): 443-449.

Cowie, H. & Colliety, P. (2016). Who cares about the bullies? Pastoral Care in Education, 34(1): 24-33.

Cowie, H., Huser, C. & Myers, C. (2014). The use of participatory methods in researching the experiences of children and young people, Croatian Journal of Education, 16(2): 51-66.

Myers, C-A. & Cowie, H. (2013) An investigation into the roles of victim, bully and bystanders in role-play incidents of cyberbullying amongst university students in England, Pastoral Care in Education, 31(3); 251-267.

Cowie, H. (2013) Cyberbullying and its impact on young people’s emotional health and well-being, The Psychiatrist, 37: 167-170.

Smith, P. & Cowie, H. (2010) Perspectives on emotional labour and bullying: reviewing the role of emotions in nursing and healthcare, International Journal of Work Organization and Emotion, 3(3): 227-236.

 Cowie, H. and Kurihara, S. (2009) Peer support in Japan: inside and outside perspectives, Gendai Esprit, 502, 61-72.
 Allan, H. T., Cowie, H. & Smith, P. A. (2009) Overseas nurses’ experiences of discrimination: a case of racist bullying? Journal of Nursing Management, 17: 898-906
 Cowie, H. (2009) Understanding why children and young people engage in bullying, Hiroshima University Journal of Learning Science, 2, 103-110.
 Naylor, P., Cowie, H., Dawkins, J., Talamelli, L. & Walters, J. (2009) Impact of a mental health teaching programme on adolescents: a two-group pre-test post-test control group design, British Journal of Psychiatry,194, 365-370.
 Cowie, H. (2009) Tackling cyberbullying: A cross cultural comparison, International Journal of Emotional Education, 1(2): 3-13.
 Cowie, H., Hutson, N., Oztug, O. and Myers, C. (2008) The impact of peer support schemes on pupils’ perceptions of bullying, aggression and safety at school, Emotional and Behavioural Difficulties, 13(1): 63-71.
 Cowie, H. and Oztug, O. (2008) Pupils’ perceptions of safety at school, Pastoral Care in Education, 26(2): 59-67.
 Myers, C., Hutson, N., Cowie, H. & Jennifer, D. 2008) Taking stock of violence in UK schools: risk, regulation and responsibility, Education and Urban Society, 40(4): 494-505.
 Hutson, N. & Cowie, H. (2007) Setting an e-mail peer support scheme, Pastoral Care in Education, 25(4): 12-16.
 Cowie, H., Hutson, N. & Myers, C. (2007) Young offenders in prison – perceptions of mental health disorders and their treatment: a qualitative analysis. International Journal on Violence at School, 4, 3-18.

Recent book chapters 
 Cowie, H. (2019). Peer support. In S. Hupp & J. D. Jewell (Eds.) Wiley Encyclopedia of Child and Adolescent Development. Chichester: John Wiley & Sons.

Cowie, H. & Myers, C-A. (2016). What do we know about bullying and cyberbullying among university students? In H. Cowie & C-A. Myers (Eds.) Bullying Among University Students. London: Routledge (pp. 3–14).

Cowie, H. (2013) The immediate and long-term effects of bullying. I. Rivers & N. Duncan (Eds.) Bullying: Experiences and Discourses of Sexuality and Gender. London: Routledge, pp. 10–18.

Cowie, H. & Smith, P. K. (2013) Peer support as a means of improving school safety and reducing bullying and violence. In A. Ovejero, P. K. Smith & S. Yubero (Eds.) El Acoso Escolar y Su Prevencion: Perspesctivas Internacionales. Biblioteca Nueva, pp. 263–285.

Cowie, H., Bauman, S., Myers, C., Pörhöla, M. & Almeida, A. (2013) Cyberbullying amongst university students: an emergent cause for concern. In P. K. Smith & G. Steffgen (Eds.) Cyberbullying Through the New Media. London: Psychology Press, pp. 165–177.

James. A., Cowie, H. & Toda, Y. (2013) Peer support. In: K. Yamasaki. Y. Toda & Y. Watanabe (Eds.) Prevention Education in the World. Tokyo: Kaneko-shoboh, pp. 147–1

Cowie, H. & Smith, P. K. (2010) "Peer support as a means of improving school safety and reducing bullying and violence". In B. Doll, J. Charvat, J. Baker & G. Stoner (Eds.) Handbook of Prevention Research. New Jersey: Lawrence Erlbaum

 Cowie, H. (2010) Understanding why children and young people engage in bullying at school. In C. Barter & D. Berridge (eds.) Children Behaving Badly? Exploring Peer Violence Between Children and Young People.
 Cowie, H. (2010) Peer support in Japan: a perspective from the outside. In K. Östermann (ed.) Indirect and Direct Aggression. Frankfurt am Main, Peter Lang, pp. 133–142.
 Cowie, H. (2010) Core interventions to counteract school bullying. In T. Aoki (Ed.) Moral Education in Schools. Tokyo: Ya Publications.
 Cowie, H. (2009) Peer support challenges school bullying. In C. Cefai & P. Cooper (eds.) Promoting Emotional Education. London: Jessica Kingsley. (chapter 6)
 Jennifer, D. & Cowie, H. (2009) Engaging Children and Young People Actively in Research. In K. Bryan (ed.) Communication in Healthcare . London: Peter Lang European Academic Publishers
 Cowie, H. (2007) Programa de actuación para la violencia escolar (VISTA): un marco global para la escuela. In M. de Esteban Villar (ed.) Nuevos Retos para Convivir en las Aulas: Construyendo La Escuela Cīvica. Madrid: Fundación Europea Sociedad y Educación.
 Cowie, H. (2006) Young people themselves tackle the problem of school violence. In Österman, K., & Björkqvist, K. (Eds.). Contemporary research on aggression. Volume I: School violence. Proceedings of the XVI World Meeting of the International Society for Research on Aggression, Santorini, Greece, 2004. Åbo, Finland: Åbo Akademi University. pp 108–114.

References

Living people
British social scientists
Academics of the University of Surrey
Fellows of the British Psychological Society
Academics of Brunel University London
Academic staff of Hiroshima University
Academic staff of Åbo Akademi University
Finnish women academics
Year of birth missing (living people)